Rev. Nonin Chowaney (OPW) (died July 29, 2022) was an American Soto Zen priest and brush calligrapher. A Dharma heir of the late Dainin Katagiri-roshi, Chowaney received Dharma transmission in 1989 and was the founder of an organization of Soto priests known as The Order of the Prairie Wind (OPW), which is now defunct. 

Chowaney was longtime abbot of the Nebraska Zen Center in Omaha. In 1999, Chowaney founded the Zen Center of Pittsburgh - Deep Spring Temple in Bell Acres, Pennsylvania and appointed Rev. Kyōki Roberts as the head priest. Then in 2001 he gave Dharma transmission to Roberts, his only ordained student.

See also
Buddhism in the United States
Timeline of Zen Buddhism in the United States

References

20th-century births
2022 deaths
Soto Zen Buddhists
Zen Buddhist priests
American Zen Buddhists
Year of birth missing